Nellis Wash Wilderness is a 16,423 acre (6,646 ha) wilderness area located on the eastern side of the Newberry Mountains and extends eastward towards Lake Mohave. It shares a border with the Spirit Mountain Wilderness on its southern point. Nellis Wash Wilderness was designated as a wilderness area in 2002 and is managed by the National Park Service in Lake Mead National Recreation Area.

Geography 
During the summer, temperatures could reach as high as 120°F (48.9°C). The area has a mostly desert-based terrain with no fresh water source nearby. The area shows signs of historical mining activity. Vegetation that can be found in the area includes creosote bush and catclaw acacia. Some faunas that are native to the location are black-tailed jackrabbits, horned lizards, and kangaroo rats.

See also 

 List of wilderness areas in the United States

References 

Wilderness areas of Nevada
Protected areas of Clark County, Nevada